Uray Airport  is an airport in Khanty-Mansi Autonomous Okrug, Russia located 4 km southeast of Uray. It services up to medium-sized airliners.

Airlines and destinations

References

External links

Airports built in the Soviet Union
Airports in Khanty-Mansi Autonomous Okrug